Acajete Municipality is a municipality in Puebla in south-eastern Mexico. The municipality is located in the centre of the state and its capital has the same name as the state..

References 

Municipalities of Puebla